Duncan Harvey (born 12 March 1981) is an Australian bobsledder who has competed since 2008. He finished 29th in the two-man event at the FIBT World Championships 2009 in Lake Placid, New York.

Harvey competed in lesser events prior to the 2010 Winter Olympics, earning his best finish of third twice.

He was selected to compete at the 2010 Winter Olympics in the four-man event, but withdrew on 23 February 2010 to concussions suffered at the Whistler Sliding Centre. Harvey finished 22nd in the two-man event.

Prior to becoming a bobsledder, Harvey was ranked among the top five hurdlers in Australia from 2001 to 2007.

References

External links
 "Bobsleigh-Concussed Australians out of four-man race." – 23 February 2010 Yahoo! Sports Martyn Herman article Retrieved 24 February 2010.
 
 Vancouver2010.com profile.

1981 births
Australian male bobsledders
Bobsledders at the 2010 Winter Olympics
Bobsledders at the 2014 Winter Olympics
Living people
Olympic bobsledders of Australia